In thermodynamics, a component is one of a collection of chemically independent constituents of a system. The number of components represents the minimum number of independent chemical species necessary to define the composition of all phases of the system.

Calculating the number of components in a system is necessary when applying Gibbs' phase rule in determination of the number of degrees of freedom of a system.

The number of components is equal to the number of distinct chemical species (constituents), minus the number of chemical reactions between them, minus the number of any constraints (like charge neutrality or balance of molar quantities).

Calculation
Suppose that a chemical system has  elements and  chemical species (elements or compounds). The latter are combinations of the former, and each species  can be represented as a sum of elements:

where  are the integers denoting number of atoms of element  in molecule . Each species is determined by a vector (a row of this matrix), but the rows are not necessarily linearly independent. The chemical species represented by those  vectors are components of the system.

If, for example, the species are C (in the form of graphite), CO2 and CO, then

Since CO can be expressed as CO = (1/2)C + (1/2)CO2, it is not independent and C and CO can be chosen as the components of the system.

There are two ways that the vectors can be dependent. One is that some pairs of elements always appear in the same ratio in each species. An example is a series of polymers that are composed of different numbers of identical units. In addition, some combinations of elements may be forbidden by chemical kinetics.

Equivalently, if  is the number of independent reactions that can take place, then

Examples

CaCO3 - CaO - CO2 system
This is an example of a system with several phases, which at ordinary temperatures are two solids and a gas. There are three chemical species (CaCO3, CaO and CO2) and one  reaction:

 CaCO3  CaO + CO2. 

The number of components is then 3 - 1 = 2.

Water - Hydrogen - Oxygen system
The reactions included in the calculation are only those that actually occur under the given conditions, and not those that might occur under different conditions such as higher temperature or the presence of a catalyst. For example, the dissociation of water into its elements does not occur at ordinary temperature, so a system of water, hydrogen and oxygen at 25 °C has 3 independent components.

References 

Chemical thermodynamics